Pinseque is a municipality located in the province of Zaragoza, Aragon, Spain. According to the 2014 census (INE), the municipality has a population of 3,625 inhabitants, with a population density of 224.88 people per km² (582.4 per square mile).

Facts  
 The town is located 20 km (12.42 mi) from Zaragoza, the capital city of Aragon.
 Pinseque is 230 m (750 ft) above the sea level.
 The municipality's average temperature is 14 °C (57.2 °F).

Politics

Election results 

There are only 11 councilors in the Pinseque's town hall.

History

Town name 
The town name of Pinseque comes from pin (pine) and sec (dry), probably because there were a pine forest here before its population. In Aragonese language, it is called Puysec - from puig (hill) and sec (dry). As the word dry is included in both Aragonese and Spanish language names, maybe the current town's area was considered very dry for crops or plant growing. When the Visigoths came to Spain, the village was called Pinsech.

References

Municipalities in the Province of Zaragoza